Bankura horse  is the terracotta horse, produced in Panchmura village in Bankura district in the Indian state of West Bengal. It has been praised for “its elegant stance and unique abstraction of basic values.” Originally used for village rituals, it now adorns drawing rooms around the world as symbols of Indian folk-art. It is the logo of All India Handicrafts.

Tradition

In India, terracotta traditions are found from the earliest times.  The outskirts of many an Indian village have a pipal tree with terracotta animal figures lying underneath it. They are symbols of fulfillment of aspirations of village folk.  In order to cater to the commercial requirements of the modern global market, the village potter is often combining the traditional rural abstractions with refined urban tastes to show pieces of terracotta art.

The principal centres where the terracotta horses and elephants are produced are Panchmura, Rajagram, Sonamukhi and Hamirpur. Each place has its local style. The Panchmura-style of pottery is considered the best and the finest of all the four types.

Process
Different parts of the hollow terracotta horses are turned out in separate parts, on the potter’s wheel. The four legs, the full neck in two parts and the face (seven pieces in all) are turned out separately on the wheel and then joined together. Additional clay is used for making up defects that may remain in the shape of the body. The leaf-like ears and the tails are done in moulds and are later inserted in grooves left on the body. The clay figures are then allowed to dry in the sun. After a little drying in the sun, holes are made on appropriate parts of the body in order that the inner and the outer surfaces of the body are equally dried. Cracks may develop in the body because of unequal drying of the inner and the outer portions. Drying is undert5 done in the normal temperature of a closed room for about six or seven days. Then they are brought out of the room and heated in the sun. Finally they are fired.

The terracotta horses of Bankura are produced in two different colours. This achieved by modifying the kiln atmosphere: terracotta red colour is obtained by letting out the smoke through the vents of the kiln during firing to generate an oxidising atmosphere, and the black colour is obtained by sealing the vents to generate a reducing atmosphere.

Significance
In the Rarh region where Dharmathakur is worshipped there is no end to the symbolic use of terracotta and wooden horses. Symbolic sacrifice of horses for fulfillment of wishes is common for many village gods and goddesses, but an assembly of terracotta horses of various shapes and sizes representing sacrifice on wish fulfillment is perhaps peculiar to Dharmathakur.

Shape
Over the centuries the potters have moved away from a realistic presentation to a representational presentation. Potter-artists of different regions focused on different parts of the animal body in such a manner that representation of the same became more important than representation of the entire body of the animal.

Geographical Indications 
Bankura horse is registered under the Geographical Indications of West Bengal, named Bankura Panchmura Terracota Craft on 28 March 2018.

See also 

 
 Crafts of India
 Manasa chali, terracota idol of Hindu deity Manasa Debi
 Pottery in the Indian subcontinent

Bankura horse gallery

References

Geographical indications in West Bengal
Culture of West Bengal
Terracotta
Bankura district
Terracotta sculptures
Indian handicrafts
Horses in art
Bengal terracotta
Tourist attractions in Bankura district